George Alexandru Pușcaș (born 8 April 1996) is a Romanian professional footballer who plays as a forward for  club Genoa, on loan from EFL Championship club Reading, and the Romania national team.

Club career

Inter Milan
Pușcaș made his Internazionale debut on 1 February 2015 by appearing in the last minutes of a 3–1 loss to Sassuolo in the 2014–15 Serie A matchday 21. On 26 February 2015, he made his UEFA Europa League debut as a substitute replacing Rodrigo Palacio in the 89th minute of a 1–0 home win over Celtic. On 4 April 2014, Pușcaș played his first match as a starter for Internazionale, a 1–1 home draw against Parma, he was replaced by Mateo Kovačić in the 46th minute.

Various loans
On 4 August 2015, Pușcaș, along with his teammate Gaston Camara, were sent on loan at Serie B for the 2015–16 season. On 9 August he made his debut for Bari as a substitute replacing Anthony Partipilo in the 60th minute of a 2–1 home defeat against Foggia in the second round of Coppa Italia. He played his first Serie B match later on 22 September 2015 in the 4–1 away loss to Crotone, starting and playing for 57 minutes. On 22 February he played his first entire match for Bari, a 1–0 away defeat against Virtus Lanciano. On 1 March, Pușcaș scored twice in a 4–0 home win over Ternana. Pușcaș ended his loan to Bari with 18 appearances, 5 goals and 1 assist.

On 15 July, Pușcaș was loaned to Serie B side Benevento on a 2-years loan deal. On 7 August he made his debut in a match loss 4–2 at penalties after a 0–0 home draw against Salernitana in the second round of Coppa Italia; he was replaced by Fabio Mazzeo in the 68th minute. On 27 August he made his Serie B debut for Benevento as a substitute replacing Fabio Ceravolo in the 71st minute and scoring his first goal 8 minutes later in a 2–0 home win over SPAL. On 20 September he played his first entire match for Benevento, a 1–1 home draw against Pro Vercelli. On 19 November, Pușcaș scored his second goal, again as a substitute, in the 89th minute of a 4–0 home win over Brescia. In June 2017 he scored the goal that sealed Benevento's promotion to Serie A.

Pușcaș started his second season with Benevento by playing 80 minutes in a 4–0 home defeat against Perugia in the third round of Coppa Italia. On 20 August, Pușcaș made his Serie A debut for Benevento in a 2–1 away defeat against Sampdoria. On 3 December 2017, Pușcaș scored his first Serie A goal in the 2–2 home draw versus Milan that gave Benevento their first ever point in the top flight. In January 2018 he was recalled by Inter, thus leaving Benevento with a total of 34 appearances and 8 goals.

On 29 January 2018, Pușcaș was again sent on loan, this time returning at Serie B to Novara. He debuted for his new team five days later in the 2–1 home defeat to Ascoli, netting his team's only goal in the first half. The following week, in his second appearance, Pușcaș scored his first career hat-trick to give his side the 3–1 win at Cittadella.

Palermo
On 8 August 2018, Pușcaș joined Palermo and subsequently signed a four-year contract. The deal was reported to be worth €3.25 million plus bonuses. On 3 November 2018, he registered his first league goal for the Sicilian team by scoring in the 90th minute of a 2–1 victory over Cosenza. At the end of the season, with Palermo relegated to Serie D, Internazionale exercised their buy back option for the Romanian forward.

Reading
On 7 August 2019, Pușcaș signed for Reading on a five-year contract from Inter Milan for €8 million euros plus €2 million in bonuses, becoming Reading's most expensive signing in history. He scored his first goal for Reading in an EFL Cup tie against Wycombe Wanderers on 13 August 2019, and also went on to score one of the penalties as Reading won the shoot-out. On 18 August 2019 he scored two goals on his home league debut for the Royals against Cardiff City. Pușcaș scored his first EFL Championship hat-trick against Wigan Athletic on 30 November 2019 in a 3-1 victory, with the goals all coming in the space of 4 minutes 54 seconds.

Loans to Pisa and Genoa
On 31 January 2022, Pușcaș returned to Italy, joining Pisa on loan with a conditional obligation to buy.

On 25 August 2022, Pușcaș moved on a new Italian loan at Genoa.

International career
Because of his Hungarian ancestry, Pușcaș could have represented Hungary via naturalisation. In 2013, the then-Hungarian head coach Sándor Egervári went to watch him play in the Romanian second division, but gave up on him by saying that there are already players of his ability in Hungary.

Pușcaș scored seven times for Romania under-21 in the 2019 UEFA European Championship qualifiers, as his side won its group and progressed to the final tournament in Italy. On 18 June 2019, he obtained the penalty from which he scored the opener in a 4–1 victory over Croatia. He netted again in the next group game against England, surpassing Ionuț Luțu as the highest scorer of the Tricolorii mici. Pușcaș then gave Romania a half-time lead after scoring a double against Germany in the semi-finals, but Romania eventually lost the match 4–2.

Pușcaș earned his first full cap for Romania on 23 May 2018, entering in the 74th minute of a 3–2 win against Chile. On 17 November that year, he scored his first goal in a 3–0 UEFA Nations League defeat of Lithuania.

Personal life
Born in Marghita, Pușcaș is of partial Hungarian descent and can understand the Hungarian language. His family name, Pușcaș, originates from the Hungarian Puskás.

Career statistics

Club

International

Scores and results list Romania's goal tally first, score column indicates score after each Pușcaș goal.

Honours
Individual
Gazeta Sporturilor Romanian Footballer of the Year runner-up: 2019
UEFA European Under-21 Championship Silver Boot: 2019
UEFA European Under-21 Championship Team of the Tournament: 2019

References

External links

1996 births
Living people
People from Marghita
People from Bihor County
Romanian footballers
Romanian sportspeople of Hungarian descent
Association football forwards
CF Liberty Oradea players
FC Bihor Oradea players
Inter Milan players
S.S.C. Bari players
Benevento Calcio players
Novara F.C. players
Palermo F.C. players
Reading F.C. players
Pisa S.C. players
Genoa C.F.C. players
Liga II players
Serie A players
Serie B players
English Football League players
Romania youth international footballers
Romania under-21 international footballers
Romania international footballers
Romanian expatriate footballers
Romanian expatriate sportspeople in Italy
Romanian expatriate sportspeople in England
Expatriate footballers in Italy
Expatriate footballers in England